Mats Størseth Lillebo (born 29 July 1994) is a Norwegian footballer who plays for Stjørdals-Blink.

Hailing from Skatval, he was a very prolific goalscorer for Stjørdals-Blink, netting 42 times in 2014 (including the cup).

Career statistics

Club

References

1994 births
Living people
People from Stjørdal
Norwegian footballers
Norwegian First Division players
Norwegian Second Division players
Eliteserien players
Ranheim Fotball players
IL Stjørdals-Blink players
Association football forwards
Sportspeople from Trøndelag